The Elephant Man is a 1980 British-American biographical drama film about Joseph Merrick (John Merrick in the film), a severely deformed man in late 19th-century London. The film was directed by David Lynch, produced by Mel Brooks (who was uncredited, to avoid audiences anticipating the film being in the vein of his comedic works, although his company Brooksfilms is in the opening credits) and Jonathan Sanger, and stars John Hurt, Anthony Hopkins, Anne Bancroft, John Gielgud, Wendy Hiller, Michael Elphick, Hannah Gordon and Freddie Jones. The Elephant Man is generally regarded as one of Lynch's more accessible and mainstream works, alongside The Straight Story (1999).

The screenplay was adapted by Lynch, Christopher De Vore and Eric Bergren from Frederick Treves's The Elephant Man and Other Reminiscences (1923) and Ashley Montagu's The Elephant Man: A Study in Human Dignity (1971). It was shot in black-and-white and featured make-up work by Christopher Tucker.

The Elephant Man was a critical and commercial success with eight Academy Award nominations, including Best Picture, Best Director, Best Adapted Screenplay, and Best Actor. After receiving widespread criticism for failing to honour the make-up effects, the Academy of Motion Picture Arts and Sciences was prompted to create the Academy Award for Best Makeup the following year. The film also won the BAFTA Awards for Best Film, Best Actor, and Best Production Design and was nominated for Golden Globe awards. It also won a French César Award for Best Foreign Film.

Plot

Frederick Treves, a surgeon at the London Hospital, finds John Merrick in a Victorian freak show in London's East End, where he is kept by Mr. Bytes, the brutish ringmaster. His head is kept hooded, and his "owner", who views him as intellectually disabled, is paid by Treves to bring him to the hospital for examination. Treves presents Merrick to his colleagues and highlights his deformed skull, which forces him to sleep with his head on his knees, since if he were to lie down, he would asphyxiate. On Merrick's return, he is beaten so badly by Bytes that he has to call Treves for medical help. Treves brings him back to the hospital.

Merrick is tended to by hospital matron Mrs. Mothershead, as the other nurses are too frightened of him. Mr. Carr Gomm, the hospital's Governor, is against housing Merrick, as the hospital does not accept "incurables". To prove that Merrick can make progress, Treves trains him to say a few conversational sentences and part of the 23rd Psalm. Carr Gomm sees through this ruse, but as he is leaving, Merrick begins to recite the whole of the Psalm.  Merrick tells the doctors that he knows how to read, and has memorized the 23rd Psalm because it is his favorite. Carr Gomm permits him to stay, and Merrick spends his time practicing conversation with Treves and building a model of a cathedral he can see from his window.

Merrick has tea with Treves and his wife, and is so overwhelmed by their kindness that he shows them his mother's picture. He believes he must have been a "disappointment" to his mother, but hopes she would be proud to see him with his "lovely friends". Merrick begins to take guests in his rooms, including the actress Madge Kendal, who gives him a copy of Romeo and Juliet; they play some lines from it and Kendal kisses Merrick on the lips. Merrick quickly becomes an object of curiosity to high society, and Mrs. Mothershead expresses concerns that he is still being put on display as a freak. Treves begins to question the morality of his own actions. Meanwhile, a night porter named Jim starts selling tickets to locals, who come at night to gawk at the "Elephant Man".

The issue of Merrick's residence is challenged at a hospital council meeting, but he is guaranteed permanent residence by command of the hospital's royal patron, Queen Victoria, who sends word with her daughter-in-law Alexandra. However, during one of Jim's raucous late-night showings Merrick is kidnapped by Bytes. A witness reports this to Treves, who confronts Jim about what he has done, and Mothershead fires him.

Bytes takes Merrick on the road as a circus attraction once again.  During a "show" in Belgium, Merrick, who is weak and dying, collapses, causing a drunken Bytes to lock him in a cage at night with some apes and leave him to die. Merrick is released by his fellow freakshow attractions. Upon returning to London, he is harassed through Liverpool Street station by several young boys and accidentally knocks down a young girl. Merrick is chased, unmasked, and cornered by an angry mob. He cries "I am not an elephant! I am not an animal! I am a human being! I ... am ... a ... man!" before collapsing. Policemen return Merrick to the hospital and Treves. He recovers some of his health, but is dying of chronic obstructive pulmonary disease. Treves and Mothershead take Merrick, accompanying Princess Alexandra, to see a magical pantomime.  Kendal comes on stage afterwards and dedicates the performance to him, and a proud Merrick receives a standing ovation from the audience.

Back at the hospital, Merrick thanks Treves for all he has done, and completes his cathedral model. Saying "It is finished", he lies down on his back in bed and dies. He is consoled by a vision of his mother, who quotes Lord Tennyson's "Nothing Will Die".

Cast
 Anthony Hopkins as Frederick Treves, a doctor who takes John from the freakshow to work in the hospital
 John Hurt as John Merrick, an intelligent, friendly and kind-hearted man who is feared by most people in his society because of his severe deformity.
 Hannah Gordon as Ann Treves
 Anne Bancroft as Madge Kendal
 John Gielgud as Francis Carr Gomm
 Wendy Hiller as Mrs Mothershead
 Freddie Jones as Mr Bytes, the evil ringmaster (based on Tom Norman)
 Frederick Treves (great nephew of Dr Frederick Treves) as Alderman
 Michael Elphick as Jim, the dishonest night porter
 Dexter Fletcher as Bytes' boy
 Helen Ryan as Alexandra, Princess of Wales
 John Standing as Fox
 Lesley Dunlop as Nora, Merrick's nurse
 Phoebe Nicholls (picture)/Lydia Lisle (footage) as Mary Jane Merrick
 Morgan Sheppard as man in pub
 Kenny Baker as plumed dwarf
 Pat Gorman as Fairground Bobby
 Pauline Quirke as prostitute 
 Nula Conwell as Nurse Kathleen, one of Merrick's nurses

Production

Development
Producer Jonathan Sanger optioned the script from writers Christopher De Vore and Eric Bergren after receiving the script from his babysitter. Sanger had been working as Mel Brooks' assistant director on High Anxiety. Sanger showed Brooks the script, whereupon he decided to help finance via Brooksfilms, his new company. Brooks' personal assistant, Stuart Cornfeld, suggested David Lynch to Sanger.

Sanger met Lynch and they shared scripts they were working on (The Elephant Man and Lynch's unrealized Ronnie Rocket). Lynch told Sanger that he would love to direct the script after reading it, and Sanger endorsed him after hearing Lynch's ideas. However, Brooks had not heard of Lynch at the time. Sanger and Cornfeld set up an Eraserhead viewing at a 20th Century Fox screening room; Brooks loved it and enthusiastically agreed for Lynch to direct. By his own request, Brooks was not credited as executive producer to ensure that audiences would not expect a comedy after seeing his name attached.

Filming
The budget was $5 million, $4 million of which was raised from Fred Silverman of NBC. The remainder came from EMI Films.

For his second feature and first studio film, albeit one independently financed, Lynch provided the musical direction and sound design. Lynch tried to design the make-up himself too but the design didn't work. The makeup, now supervised by Christopher Tucker, was based on direct casts of Merrick's body, which had been kept in the Royal London Hospital's private museum. The makeup took seven to eight hours to apply each day and two hours to delicately remove. John Hurt would arrive on set at 5am and shoot his scenes from noon until 10pm. After his first experience of the inconvenience of having to apply the makeup and perform with it, he called his girlfriend, saying, "I think they have finally managed to make me hate acting."

Because of the strain on the actor, he worked alternate days. Lynch originally wanted Jack Nance for the title character. "But it just wasn't in the cards", Lynch says; the role went to Hurt after Brooks, Lynch and Sanger saw his performance as Quentin Crisp in The Naked Civil Servant.

The film is bookended with surrealist sequences centred around Merrick's mother and her death. Lynch used Samuel Barber's Adagio for Strings to underline the climax and Merrick's own death. Composer John Morris argued against using the music, stating that "this piece is going to be used over and over and over again in the future... And every time it's used in a film it's going to diminish the effect of the scene."

Post-production
Following their return from England with a print, Lynch and Sanger screened The Elephant Man for Brooks, who suggested some minor cuts but told them that the film would be released as they had made it.

Lawsuit
A West End play of the same name was enjoying a successful Broadway run at the time of the film's production. The producers sued Brooksfilms over the use of the title.

Reception

Box office
The Elephant Man was a box office hit, grossing $26 million in the United States. In Japan, it was the second highest-grossing foreign film of the year with theatrical rentals of ¥2.45 billion, behind only The Empire Strikes Back.

Critical response
On review aggregator Rotten Tomatoes, it has an approval rating of 92% based on 59 reviews, with an average score of 8.5/10. The site's critical consensus reads, "David Lynch's relatively straight second feature finds an admirable synthesis of compassion and restraint in treating its subject, and features outstanding performances by John Hurt and Anthony Hopkins." On Metacritic, the film has a weighted average score of 78 out of 100 based on 16 critic reviews, indicating "generally favourable reviews".

Vincent Canby wrote: "Mr. Hurt is truly remarkable. It can't be easy to act under such a heavy mask ... the physical production is beautiful, especially Freddie Francis's black-and-white photography."

A small number of critics were less favourable. Roger Ebert gave it 2/4 stars, writing: "I kept asking myself what the film was really trying to say about the human condition as reflected by John Merrick, and I kept drawing blanks." In the book The Spectacle of Deformity: Freak Shows and Modern British Culture, Nadja Durbach describes the work as "much more mawkish and moralising than one would expect from the leading postmodern surrealist filmmaker" and "unashamedly sentimental". She blamed this mawkishness on the use of Treves' memoirs as source material.

The Elephant Man has since been ranked among the best films of the 1980s in Time Out (where it placed 19th) and Paste (56th). The film also received five votes in the 2012 Sight & Sound polls.

Accolades

The Elephant Man was nominated for eight Academy Awards, tying Raging Bull at the 53rd Academy Awards, including Best Picture, Actor in a Leading Role (Hurt), Art Direction-Set Decoration (Stuart Craig, Robert Cartwright, Hugh Scaife), Best Costume Design, Best Director, Best Film Editing, Music: Original Score, and Writing: Screenplay Based on Material from Another Medium. However, it did not win any.

Industry experts were appalled that the film was not going to be honoured for its make-up effects when the Academy of Motion Picture Arts and Sciences announced its nominations at the time. A letter of protest was sent to the Academy's Board of Governors requesting to give the film an honorary award. The Academy refused, but in response to the outcry, they decided to give the make-up artists their own category. A year later, the Academy Award for Best Makeup category was introduced with An American Werewolf in London as its first recipient.

It did win the BAFTA Award for Best Film, as well as other BAFTA Awards for Best Actor (Hurt) and Best Production Design, and was nominated for four others: Direction, Screenplay, Cinematography and Editing.

The film is recognized by American Film Institute in these lists:
 2005: AFI's 100 Years...100 Movie Quotes:
 John Merrick: "I am not an animal! I am a human being. I am a man." – Nominated

Home media
The film has been issued many times on VHS, Betamax, CED, LaserDisc and DVD. The first DVD was released on December 11, 2001 by Paramount Home Entertainment. The version released as part of the David Lynch Lime Green Box includes several interviews with Lynch and Hurt, and a Joseph Merrick documentary. This material is also available on the exclusive treatment on the European market as part of Optimum Releasing's StudioCanal Collection. The film has been available on Blu-ray since 2009 throughout Europe and in Australia and Japan but not in the US (however the discs will play in both region A & B players).
 
A 4K restoration (created from the original camera negative, supervised by Lynch) was carried out for the film's 40th anniversary, and was released in a director-approved special edition in both Blu-ray and DVD formats from The Criterion Collection in the United States on September 29, 2020. The restoration was also released on 4K Ultra HD Blu-ray (including a remastered Blu-ray) in the UK in April 2020.

A tie-in novelization by Christine Sparks was published by Ballantine Books in 1980.

Soundtrack
The musical score of The Elephant Man was composed and conducted by John Morris, and it was performed by the National Philharmonic Orchestra. In 1980, the company 20th Century Fox Records published this film's original musical score as both an LP album and as a cassette in the United States. Its front cover artwork features a masked John Merrick against a backdrop of smoke, as seen on the advance theatrical poster for the film.

In 1994, the first compact disc (CD) issue of the film score was made by the company Milan, which specializes in film scores and soundtrack albums.

Track listing for the first U.S. release on LP

Side one
"The Elephant Man Theme" – 3:46
"Dr. Treves Visits the Freak Show and Elephant Man" – 4:08
"John Merrick and Psalm" – 1:17
"John Merrick and Mrs. Kendal" – 2:03
"The Nightmare" – 4:39

Side two
"Mrs. Kendal's Theater and Poetry Reading" – 1:58
"The Belgian Circus Episode" – 3:00
"Train Station" – 1:35
"Pantomime" – 2:20
"Adagio for Strings" – 5:52
"Recapitulation" – 5:35

Cultural influence
The Jam's former bassist Bruce Foxton was inspired strongly by the film, and in response wrote the song "Freak" with the single's cover making a reference to the film.

Actor Bradley Cooper credits watching the film with his father as a child as his inspiration to become an actor. Cooper played the character on Broadway in 2013.

In season 3, episode 21 of The Simpsons, "Black Widower", Lisa daydreams of Aunt Selma's new boyfriend as the Elephant Man.

The 1992 film Batman Returns parodies the iconic line "I am not an animal. I am a man." In one scene, the Penguin, after being called Oswald, angrily yells "I am not a human being! I am an animal!"

British TV presenter Karl Pilkington often has cited it as his favourite film. Pilkington's love for the film brought many new features to his various podcasts and radio shows.

Singer and songwriter Michael Jackson used excerpts from the film in his song "Morphine" from the 1997 remix album Blood on the Dance Floor: HIStory in the Mix.

Musician Michael Stipe loves the film and cites it as an inspiration for the R.E.M. song "Carnival of Sorts (Boxcars)". Another R.E.M. song, "New Test Leper", quotes the line "I am not an animal."

Musician Nicole Dollanganger featured a sample of the film in her 2012 song "Cries of the Elephant Man Bones".

Musician Mylène Farmer's song "Psychiatric" from the 1991 album L'Autre... is a tribute to the film and John Hurt's voice is sampled throughout the song, repeating several times: "I'm a human being, I'm not an animal".

The 2019 comedy TV series "Year of the Rabbit" features Merrick as a character, reimagined as a confident, somewhat sassy, and decidedly camp theatrical performer, who has become independently wealthy through managing his own freak show (of which he is the star attraction).

See also
 The Elephant Man (play)
 The Elephant Man (1982 film)

References

Further reading
 Shai Biderman & Assaf Tabeka. "The Monster Within: Alienation and Social Conformity in The Elephant Man in: The Philosophy of David Lynch 207 (University Press of Kentucky, 2011).

External links 

 

1980 films
1980s biographical drama films
American biographical drama films
British biographical drama films
1980s English-language films
American black-and-white films
British black-and-white films
Films about disability
Films about sideshow performers
Circus films
Films adapted into plays
Drama films based on actual events
Films based on non-fiction books
Films directed by David Lynch
Films produced by Mel Brooks
Brooksfilms films
Paramount Pictures films
Films scored by John Morris
Best Foreign Film César Award winners
Films set in London
Films set in the 1880s
Films shot in London
Films shot at Shepperton Studios
Best Film BAFTA Award winners
Cultural depictions of Joseph Merrick
EMI Films films
Films based on multiple works
1980 drama films
Films about prejudice
1980s American films
1980s British films